Regifted is the third official extended play by the Christian pop punk band, Eleventyseven, as well as their first official Christmas music release.

The EP was released digitally on November 7, 2012. It was also released in a physical format, but is no longer in print as a set number of copies were made. The EP contains five Christmas-themed tracks, all of which are either covers or classic Christmas carols.

Lead singer Matt Langston posted a sneak preview of the EP via a vlog post on YouTube October 15, 2012 in which he talked a little about the track "Wonderful Christmastime."

Track listing

References

2012 EPs
Eleventyseven albums
2012 Christmas albums
Christmas albums by American artists